Peter VII of Alexandria may refer to:

Pope Peter VII of Alexandria (ruled in 1809–1852), Coptic Pope and Patriarch of Alexandria
Patriarch Peter VII of Alexandria (ruled in 1996–2004), Eastern Orthodox Pope and Patriarch of Alexandria